20 is the international dialing country code for Egypt.

Dialing codes

Land lines 
Land lines are operated by government-owned Telecom Egypt. The following is a list of dialing codes for the different cities in Egypt.

Mobile phone numbers 
There are currently four mobile network operators in Egypt, and they are, from oldest to newest: Orange, Vodafone, Etisalat, and We. The following is a list of mobile number dialing codes.

List of other codes 
This is a list of other miscellaneous codes used in Egypt.

Egypt
Telecommunications in Egypt
Egypt communications-related lists